"When I Think About Angels" is a song co-written and recorded by Australian country music artist Jamie O'Neal. It was released in March 2001 as the second single from O'Neal's Shiver album. The song reached Number One on the Billboard Hot Country Singles & Tracks (now Hot Country Songs) charts. It also peaked at #35 on the U.S. Billboard Hot 100. The song was written by O'Neal, Roxie Dean and Sonny Tillis.

Content
The narrator confesses that everything reminds her of her significant other.

Music video
The music video was directed by Trey Fanjoy and premiered in mid-2001. It begins in a city, where the camera does a full 360 before landing on O'Neal in a cafe sitting at a table with a cup of coffee. A butterfly lands on the cup, and the song begins. During the first chorus, the scene switches to her singing amidst a starry night, then laying on the grass singing accompanied by many butterflies. The next scene shows her singing in a village, then in the same town from the beginning of the video in the pouring rain. These scenes switch back and forth for the remainder of the video, and at the end O'Neal is back in the cafe, possibly having dreamt the whole thing. The butterfly on her coffee cup leaves, and the camera does another 360 back into the city, ending the video, the final shot of the video being an exact upside down image of the opening shot.

Chart performance
"When I Think About Angels" debuted at number 45 on the U.S. Billboard Hot Country Singles & Tracks for the chart week of March 31, 2001. Having peaked at number 1 on the chart dated for August 4, 2001, O'Neal became the first female country singer to send her first two singles to number 1 since Deana Carter did so in 1996–1997.

Year-end charts

References

2001 singles
2000 songs
Jamie O'Neal songs
Music videos directed by Trey Fanjoy
Song recordings produced by Keith Stegall
Songs written by Roxie Dean
Mercury Records singles
Songs written by Jamie O'Neal